Cactus Flats is a census-designated place in Graham County, Arizona, United States. Its population was 1,524 as of the 2020 census.

Demographics

Cactus Flats first appeared on the 2010 U.S. Census as a census-designated place (CDP).

References

Census-designated places in Graham County, Arizona